In mathematics, the multiple orthogonal polynomials (MOPs) are orthogonal polynomials in one variable that are orthogonal with respect to a finite family of measures. The polynomials are divided into two classes named type 1 and type 2.

In the literature, MOPs are also called -orthogonal polynomials, Hermite-Padé polynomials or polyorthogonal polynomials. MOPs should not be confused with multivariate orthogonal polynomials.

Multiple orthogonal polynomials
Consider a multiindex  and  positive measures  over the reals. As usual .

MOP of type 1 

and

Explanation
This defines a system of  equations for the  coefficients of the polynomials .

MOP of type 2
A monic polynomial  is of type 2 if it has degree  such that

Explanation
If we write  out, we get the following definition

Literature

López-Lagomasino, G. (2021). An Introduction to Multiple Orthogonal Polynomials and Hermite-Padé Approximation. In: Marcellán, F., Huertas, E.J. (eds) Orthogonal Polynomials: Current Trends and Applications. SEMA SIMAI Springer Series, vol 22. Springer, Cham. https://doi.org/10.1007/978-3-030-56190-1_9

References

Orthogonal polynomials